Mountain Dew is a lost 1917 American silent comedy-drama film directed by Thomas N. Heffron and starring Margery Wilson. It was produced and distributed by the Triangle Film Corporation.

Plot
As described in a film magazine, J. Hamilton Vance (Gunn) goes to the mountains to find new material for a novel. He becomes a school teacher and becomes infatuated with Roxie Bradley (Wilson), the daughter of Squire Bradley (Filson), who does not approve of his daughter's learning. Vance is successful in teaching the girl to read and write and, although he is suspected of being a revenue agent, he manages to make a few friendships. However, a stray piece of paper upon which he has begun his novel flies away and is picked up by some of the moonshiners, who then attack him. He marries Roxie and by promising to become a partner in their distillery of illicit liquor, he is allowed to continue on his way unharmed.

Cast
Margery Wilson - Roxie Bradley
Charles Gunn - J. Hamilton Vance
Thomas Washington - Roosevelt Washington
Al W. Filson - Squire Bradley
Jack Richardson - Milt Sears
Aaron Edwards - Lafe Grider
Mary Boland - Lily Bud Rainer

Reception
Like many American films of the time, Mountain Dew was subject to cuts by city and state film censorship boards. The Chicago Board of Censors cut a scene with a boy shooting Sears and three racist subtitles, "Do you care so much for education that you'll see a nigger hold a gun to your pap?", "Get the men together at the still and we'll get him and his nigger tonight", and "I'se a white nigger from Chicago".

References

External links
 

1917 films
American silent feature films
Lost American films
Triangle Film Corporation films
American black-and-white films
1910s English-language films
Films directed by Thomas N. Heffron
1917 comedy-drama films
1917 lost films
Lost comedy-drama films
1910s American films
Silent American comedy-drama films